The Boss's Daughter (original title: La Fille du patron) is a 2015 French romance film directed and co-written by Olivier Loustau and starring Loustau and Christa Theret.

Cast 
 Christa Theret as Alix Baretti
 Olivier Loustau as Vital
 Florence Thomassin as Madeleine
 Patrick Descamps as Baretti
 Stéphane Rideau as Marc
 Lola Dueñas as Virginia
 Moussa Maaskri as Azoug
 Sabine Pakora as Gladys
 Pierre Berriau as Frano
 Vincent Martinez as Eddy
 Deborah Grall as Cathy
 Ludovic Berthillot as Lolo
 Élodie Mennegand as Caroline
 Sébastien Chabal as himself

Accolades

References

External links 
 

2015 films
2015 romance films
2010s French-language films
French romance films
Films about social class
2015 directorial debut films
2010s French films